Margaux Mameri (born 12 April 1997) is a French ice hockey goaltender and member of the French national team, currently playing in the FFHG Division 2 with the Jets d’Evry-Viry. She began the 2022–23 season with HPK Hämeenlinna in the Finnish Naisten Liiga (NSML) before leaving the club in November 2022.

Playing career
As a junior player with the French national under-18 ice team, Mameri participated in the Division I tournaments of the IIHF U18 Women's World Championship in 2014 and 2015. At the 2015 tournament, she was named Best Player of the French team by the coaches as France finished the tournament in first place and earned promotion to the Top Division.

She reprepresented France with the senior national team at the 2019 IIHF Women's World Championship and the 2022 IIHF Women's World Championship Division I. She did not see ice time at either tournament, serving as third goaltender behind starter Caroline Baldin and backup Caroline Lambert in 2019 and as backup to Baldin in 2022.

References

External links
 

1997 births
Living people
IF Björklöven players
French expatriate ice hockey people
French expatriate sportspeople in Canada
French expatriate sportspeople in Sweden
French women's ice hockey goaltenders
People from Clamart
Sportspeople from Hauts-de-Seine